Thaddeus Claggett is an American politician. He serves as a Republican member for the 68th district of the Ohio House of Representatives.

Life and career 
Claggett was a businessperson.

In August 2022, Claggett defeated Mark Fraizer in the Republican primary election for the 68th district of the Ohio House of Representatives. In November 2022, he defeated write-in candidate Daniel Crawford in the general election. He succeeded Shawn Stevens. He assumed office in 2023.

References 

Living people
Year of birth missing (living people)
Place of birth missing (living people)
Republican Party members of the Ohio House of Representatives
21st-century American politicians
Ohio Republicans